Valjevo Gymnasium is a public secondary education school located in Valjevo (Valjevo High School). It was first founded in 1870. For the first two years it had only two grades.

Timeline of important years in Valjevo Gymnasium’s history:

founded in 1870,
1874 – added 3rd grade,
1875 – added 4th grade,
1893 – added 5th grade,
1894 – added 6th grade,
1898 – 5th and 6th grades ceased to exist,
1903 – 5th grade operating again,
1904 – 6th grade introduced,
1907 – 7th grade introduced,
1913 – Valjevo Gymnasium becomes fully eight grades school,
1914 – Introduces 1st secondary education exam, then The World War I started and Gymnasium worked only in 1918
1940 – Split into First and Second Gymnasium,
1942 – During World War II First Gymnasium became Boys' Gymnasium and Second Gymnasium became Girls' Gymnasium,
1952 – High Gymnasium was introduced taking middle education grades from both First and Second Gymnasium, and those two had merged into one Gymnasium again,
1966 – Moving back to the original building,
1970 – Celebrating one century since founding,
1989 – Teaching staff agreed to call the school Valjevo Gymnasium since it carried the name of Lenin from 1970

Contemporary Gymnasium
Around 760 students attend classes in this  secondary education institution. 

Educational institutions established in 1870
Gymnasiums in Serbia
Valjevo
1870s establishments in Serbia
1870 establishments in the Ottoman Empire
Palaces in Serbia